James F. Landtroop Jr. (born January 18, 1968) is an American politician and insurance businessman. He has previously served in the Texas House of Representatives, serving District 85 for one term in the early 2010s.

Political career
Landtroop first campaigned for the Texas House of Representatives in 2006, challenging Joe Heflin as both fought for the seat vacated by the retiring Pete Laney.

In 2010, Landtroop challenged Heflin again after defeating David Andrews in a partisan primary election. Landtroop won the election, garnering 62% of the vote. During his first term in the House, Landtroop was named vice chairman of the rural caucus.

After his first legislative term, Landtroop was redistricted in to District 88 and lost the Republican runoff to Ken King. Landtroop claimed the move was Republican leadership reprimanding him for not supporting House speaker Joe Straus. After that election, Landtroop and his family moved from Plainview, Texas to Lubbock, Texas.

In 2015, Landtroop announced his intentions to challenge incumbent John Frullo in a House District 84 election. Landtroop was defeated in the primary election.

Personal life
Landtroop is an insurance agent affiliated with State Farm. He graduated from Keller High School, and after initially attending Texas Wesleyan University, graduated from Texas A&M University. Landtroop and his wife Cathy have three children.

Electoral history

| colspan="6" style="text-align:center;background-color: #e9e9e9;"| General Election

| colspan="6" style="text-align:center;background-color: #e9e9e9;"| Primary Election

| colspan="6" style="text-align:center;background-color: #e9e9e9;"| General Election

| colspan="6" style="text-align:center;background-color: #e9e9e9;"| Primary Election

| colspan="6" style="text-align:center;background-color: #e9e9e9;"| Primary Runoff Election

| colspan="6" style="text-align:center;background-color: #e9e9e9;"| Primary Election

References

Living people
1968 births
People from Fort Worth, Texas
People from Plainview, Texas
People from Lubbock, Texas
Texas A&M University alumni
American businesspeople in insurance
Republican Party members of the Texas House of Representatives
21st-century American politicians